The Njakinjaki (Nyaki Nyaki) are an indigenous Noongar people of southern Western Australia, in the Wheatbelt and Great Southern  regions.

Country
They were east of Lake Grace, at Newdegate, Mount Stirling,
Bruce Rock, Kellerberrin, and Merredin. Their western frontier was through to Jitarning. Their southern reaches went as far as Lake King, and Mount Madden. The eastern boundaries ran along the area close to Lake Hope and Mount Holland.

Some words
mamon. (father)
knockan. (mother)
dooda. (tame dog)
yokkine. (wild dog)
koolongnop. (baby)
.jennok. (whiteman)

Notes

Citations

Sources

Aboriginal peoples of Western Australia
Wheatbelt (Western Australia)
Great Southern (Western Australia)